Peterborough City Rowing Club is a rowing club based at Thorpe Meadows, Peterborough, Cambridgeshire.

History
The club was founded in 1948 and is affiliated to British Rowing. In 1983 the club moved to the purpose built rowing lake at Thorpe Meadows.

The club has produced multiple British champions that include Peter Zeun, Adam Neill and James Fox.

Honours

British champions

References

Sport in Cambridgeshire
Sport in Peterborough
Rowing clubs in England
Peterborough
Rowing clubs in Cambridgeshire